The Park series or Park car is a fleet of lightweight streamlined dome-sleeper-observation cars built by the Budd Company for the Canadian Pacific Railway in 1954. Sixteen of the cars were named for a Canadian national or provincial park, while one was named for a wildlife reserve, and one was named for what was at the time a private park owned by Canadian Pacific subsidiary Dominion Atlantic Railway, but is now one of the National Historic Sites of Canada.  Via Rail acquired the fleet from Canadian Pacific in 1978 and the majority of the cars remain in active service.

Design 

The cars were constructed of stainless steel; save for a Tuscan red letterboard bearing the name "Canadian Pacific" they were unpainted. Each car was named for a Canadian national or provincial park; CP assigned numbers in the 15400-series, but the cars did not carry them. The interiors were largely plastic, including the handrails up to the dome area. Inside at the front of the car were four private rooms: three double bedrooms (D, C, and B) and one drawing room (A). A single corridor on the left hand side of the car led past the 12-seat beverage room or "Mural Lounge" (under the dome), and led to the 13-seat observation lounge at the rear of the car; a short flight of stairs was located centrally at the front of the observation lounge which led up to the dome, with seating for 24.

An initial proposal for each car to have its own decorative scheme was rejected on cost ground; instead there were two schemes: "O" and "P"; both of which were developed by Harbeson, Hough, Livingston and Larson, a firm of architects in Philadelphia frequently used by Budd. Additionally, a leading Canadian artist was commissioned to produce two murals for the beverage room: a main mural  for the front wall, and an auxiliary mural   for the right hand (window-side) wall. In addition, they were asked to provide a  decorative map for the observation lounge which was mounted above the writing desk to the right of the dome staircase. Both related to the Park the car was named after. At the time of their construction in 1954 the listed capacity throughout the car was 54 persons. Via removed the murals in 1986. Via rebuilt the cars in the early 1990s, converting them to Head End Power (HEP), and renumbering them into the 8700-series. They also added a panel of clocks to the observation lounge showing the different time zones in Canada.

Fleet list

Operation 
Budd delivered 18 Park cars for the Canadian Pacific in 1954 as part of a massive 173-car order which equipped the new transcontinental Canadian and re-equipped the Dominion. The first car to enter service was the Banff Park. Fundy Park was wrecked in a collision on the Dominion at Gull Lake, Saskatchewan, in 1959. Via Rail acquired the remaining 17 Park cars from Canadian Pacific in 1978.  14 remain on the roster. They are always assigned to the Canadian and the Jasper – Prince Rupert train, and can also be found on the Ocean and the Winnipeg – Churchill train. The three cars listed in the Preserved section below were in service until VIA converted the ex CPR Budd equipment to HEP in the early 1990s.  They were stored at Ottawa station for many years until disposition by VIA.

Preserved 
Several Park cars are no longer in regular revenue service:
 Algonquin Park is leased to the Tennessee Valley Railroad Museum in Chattanooga, Tennessee.
 Sibley Park is at the Canadian Railway Museum in Saint-Constant, Quebec.
 Riding Mountain Park was originally sold to a private owner in 2005.  As of 2015, the car is now for sale again. It is currently located in Blissfield, Michigan.

See also 
 List of Via Rail rolling stock

Notes

References

External links 

 Park car floor plan
 Complete list of Park car rolling stock

Budd Company
Canadian Pacific Railway
Railway coaches of Canada
Train-related introductions in 1954
Via Rail rolling stock